Beaver Dam is a home rule-class city in Ohio County, Kentucky, in the United States. The population was 3,409 at the 2010 census, and it is the most populous community in the county. It is named for the Beaver Dam Baptist Church which predates the town by several decades. The city was formally incorporated by the state assembly in 1873.

Geography
Beaver Dam is located at  (37.407143, -86.877752).

Beaver Dam is located at the junction of U.S. Routes 62 and 231.

Climate
The climate in this area is characterized by hot, humid summers and generally mild to cool winters.  According to the Köppen Climate Classification system, Beaver Dam has a humid subtropical climate, abbreviated "Cfa" on climate maps.

Demographics

As of the census of 2000, there were 3,033 people, 1,297 households, and 889 families residing in the city. The racial makeup of the city was 93.11% White, 3.43% African American, 0.16% Native American, 0.26% Asian, 0.07% Pacific Islander, 1.71% from other races, and 1.25% from two or more races. Hispanic or Latino of any race were 2.57% of the population.

There were 1,297 households, out of which 29.0% had children under the age of 18 living with them, 51.6% were married couples living together, 14.0% had a female householder with no husband present, and 31.4% were non-families. 29.0% of all households were made up of individuals, and 16.5% had someone living alone who was 65 years of age or older. The average household size was 2.33 and the average family size was 2.84.

In the city, the population was spread out, with 23.2% under the age of 18, 9.3% from 18 to 24, 25.6% from 25 to 44, 24.2% from 45 to 64, and 17.8% who were 65 years of age or older. The median age was 40 years. For every 100 females, there were 88.9 males. For every 100 females age 18 and over, there were 85.2 males.

The median income for a household in the city was $28,066, and the median income for a family was $35,518. Males had a median income of $30,326 versus $17,955 for females. The per capita income for the city was $16,575. About 17.6% of families and 22.0% of the population were below the poverty line, including 33.6% of those under age 18 and 15.3% of those age 65 or over.

Notable people
 Ray Chapman - only MLB player ever killed in a game
 The Crabb Family - a Southern Gospel family group

References

External links

Cities in Kentucky
Cities in Ohio County, Kentucky